The 1924 Brown Bears football team represented Brown University during the 1924 college football season. Led by 23rd-year head coach Edward N. Robinson, the Bears compiled a record of 5–4.

Schedule

References

Brown
Brown Bears football seasons
Brown Bears football